Trevowah is a hamlet south of Crantock in Cornwall, England, United Kingdom.

References

Hamlets in Cornwall